The 1960 German Grand Prix was a Formula Two race held on 31 July 1960 at Nürburgring. This was only year the German Grand Prix was run on the shorter Südschleife layout. 

Due to decreasing attendances after the departure of Mercedes-Benz, and the controversial 1959 race at AVUS, it was decided to race on the shorter layout to give spectators a better show (seeing the cars do more laps), and the race was run to Formula Two regulations, which were set to replace Formula One for 1961 anyway, since German manufacturer Porsche had a strong Formula Two car.

This race was also the fifth and final race of the 1960 Formula Two Constructors' Championship and Formula Two Drivers' Championship.

Classification

Starting grid

Start featured a 4-3-4-3-4-3 layout, with Gregory's spot left vacant.

Race

References

German Grand Prix
German Grand
Formula Two races
German Grand